Rio Formoso (English: River Handsome), is a municipality in Pernambuco with 23,628 inhabitants.

Geography

 State - Pernambuco
 Region - Zona da mata Pernambucana
 Boundaries -   Sirinhaém (N);  Tamandaré  (S);  Gameleira  (W); Tamandaré and  Atlantic Ocean   (E)
 Area - 239.8 km2
 Elevation - 5 m
 Vegetation - Forest Subperenifólia
 Climate - Hot tropical and humid
 Annual average temperature - 25.2 c
 Distance to Recife - 91 km

The municipality contains part of the strictly protected Saltinho Biological Reserve, a  conservation unit created in 1983.

Beaches

Pedra beach and Reduto beach
There are the only two beaches in Rio Formoso. The major attraction is the estuary of the Formoso River. Has an extensive area of coconut trees, sand banks and natural reefs.

Economy

The main economic activities in Rio Formoso are based in food and beverage industry  and agribusiness. Especially, coconuts, sugarcane, and creations of cattle.

Economic Indicators

Economy by Sector
2006

Health Indicators

References

Populated coastal places in Pernambuco
Municipalities in Pernambuco